Achacachi  is a town on the Altiplano plateau in the South American Andes in the La Paz Department in Bolivia. It is the capital of the Omasuyos Province.

History of Achacachi
Achacachi, as an establishment, existed before the arrival of the Spaniards, as shown by descriptions that were made on "cronicas" and "relaciones" (official papers written by authorities) by royal or ecclesiastical Spanish authorities. Achacachi was the capital of a colla "señorio" called Pacasa, in the "Umasuyus" (from Aymara: "shore side") region, which was located alongside the East of Lake Intikjarka (Titicaca) in the Peru-Bolivian plateau.

Location

Partner city
  Rome, Italy

References 

 www.ine.gov.bo

External links 
 Achacachi municipality: population data and map

Populated places in La Paz Department (Bolivia)

it:Achacachi